Johann Georg Krünitz (20 March 1728 – 20 December 1796) was a German encyclopedist who started the 242-volume Oekonomische Encyklopädie and during his lifetime managed to complete its first 72 volumes.

Life
Krünitz was born in Berlin as the son of merchant Georg Christoph Krünitz. From 1747, he studied medicine and the natural sciences in Halle (Saale), Göttingen and Frankfurt (Oder). After achieving his doctorate with a dissertation called De matrimonio multorum morborum remedio in 1749, he started to practice as a physician in Frankfurt. Krünitz married Anna Sophie Lehmann in 1752 and moved to Berlin in 1759, where he continued to practice medicine until 1776. After Anna's death in 1780, he married Charlotte Wilhelmine Halle, the daughter of economist Johann Samuel Halle.

Krünitz died in Berlin in 1795 while working on volume 73 of his Enzyklopädie. The preface to this posthumously published volume contained the following macabre fact:

References
 Annette Fröhner, Technologie und Enzyklopädismus im Übergang vom 18. zum 19. Jahrhundert. Mannheim 1994.

External links
 Electronic version of the encyclopedia, a work in progress by the University of Trier. As of August 2007, Aah! - Zythos have been digitized.

1728 births
1796 deaths
Writers from Berlin
German encyclopedists
People from the Margraviate of Brandenburg
University of Halle alumni
University of Göttingen alumni
German male non-fiction writers